Upton Town Hall is a historic town hall at 1 Main Street in Upton, Massachusetts.  The Late Gothic Revival/Queen Anne brick building was built in 1884 to a design by Worcester architects E. Boyden & Son.  It features irregular massing typical of Queen Anne style, with a variety of gables and roof lines.  When first built, the building housed town offices and the library, the latter of which has since moved out.  The interior includes a richly-decorated auditorium.

The building was listed on the National Register of Historic Places in 1999.

See also
National Register of Historic Places listings in Worcester County, Massachusetts

References

City and town halls on the National Register of Historic Places in Massachusetts
Buildings and structures in Worcester County, Massachusetts
Town halls in Massachusetts
National Register of Historic Places in Worcester County, Massachusetts
Historic district contributing properties in Massachusetts